The 2023 Madrilenian regional election will be held on Sunday, 28 May 2023, to elect the 13th Assembly of the Community of Madrid. All 135 seats in the Assembly will be up for election. Because regional elections in the Community of Madrid are mandated for the fourth Sunday of May every four years, the 2021 snap election did not alter the term of the four-year legislature starting in 2019. The election will be held simultaneously with regional elections in eleven other autonomous communities and local elections all throughout Spain.

Overview

Electoral system
The Assembly of Madrid is the devolved, unicameral legislature of the autonomous community of Madrid, having legislative power in regional matters as defined by the Spanish Constitution and the Madrilenian Statute of Autonomy, as well as the ability to vote confidence in or withdraw it from a regional president.

Voting for the Assembly is on the basis of universal suffrage, which comprises all nationals over 18 years of age, registered in the Community of Madrid and in full enjoyment of their political rights. The "begged" or expat vote system, requiring Madrilenians abroad to apply for voting before being permitted to vote, was repealed in 2022. All members of the Assembly of Madrid are elected using the D'Hondt method and a closed list proportional representation, with a threshold of five percent of valid votes—which includes blank ballots—being applied regionally. Parties not reaching the threshold are not taken into consideration for seat distribution. The Assembly is entitled to one member per each 50,000 inhabitants or fraction greater than 25,000.

Election date
The term of the Assembly of Madrid expires four years after the date of its previous election, with elections to the Assembly being fixed for the fourth Sunday of May every four years. The previous ordinary election was held on 26 May 2019, setting the election date for the Assembly on Sunday, 28 May 2023.

The president has the prerogative to dissolve the Assembly of Madrid and call a snap election, provided that no motion of no confidence is in process, no nationwide election is due and some time requirements are met: namely, that dissolution does not occur either during the first legislative session or within the legislature's last year ahead of its scheduled expiry, nor before one year has elapsed since a previous dissolution. In the event of an investiture process failing to elect a regional president within a two-month period from the first ballot, the Assembly shall be automatically dissolved and a fresh election called. Any snap election held as a result of these circumstances will not alter the period to the next ordinary election, with elected deputies merely serving out what remains of their four-year terms.

Parliamentary composition
The table below shows the composition of the parliamentary groups in the Assembly at the present time.

Parties and candidates
The electoral law allows for parties and federations registered in the interior ministry, coalitions and groupings of electors to present lists of candidates. Parties and federations intending to form a coalition ahead of an election are required to inform the relevant Electoral Commission within ten days of the election call, whereas groupings of electors need to secure the signature of at least 0.5 percent of the electorate in the Community of Madrid, disallowing electors from signing for more than one list of candidates.

Below is a list of the main parties and electoral alliances which will likely contest the election:

Opinion polls
The tables below list opinion polling results in reverse chronological order, showing the most recent first and using the dates when the survey fieldwork was done, as opposed to the date of publication. Where the fieldwork dates are unknown, the date of publication is given instead. The highest percentage figure in each polling survey is displayed with its background shaded in the leading party's colour. If a tie ensues, this is applied to the figures with the highest percentages. The "Lead" column on the right shows the percentage-point difference between the parties with the highest percentages in a poll.

Graphical summary

Voting intention estimates
The table below lists weighted voting intention estimates. Refusals are generally excluded from the party vote percentages, while question wording and the treatment of "don't know" responses and those not intending to vote may vary between polling organisations. When available, seat projections determined by the polling organisations are displayed below (or in place of) the percentages in a smaller font; 68 seats are required for an absolute majority in the Assembly of Madrid (69 until January 2023).

Voting preferences
The table below lists raw, unweighted voting preferences.

Results

Overall

Notes

References
Opinion poll sources

Other

Madrid
Madrid
Regional elections in the Community of Madrid